Coleothorpa dominicana is a species of case-bearing leaf beetle in the family Chrysomelidae. It is found in North America. These case-bearing leaf beetles lay eggs and the female beetle constructs a funnel structure that helps protect the eggs. The larvae lasts for 5 to 8 months and it takes about one year to fully develop the beetles to adulthood.

Subspecies
These two subspecies belong to the species Coleothorpa dominicana:
 Coleothorpa dominicana dominicana (Fabricius, 1801) i c g
 Coleothorpa dominicana franciscana (J. L. LeConte, 1859) i c g
Data sources: i = ITIS, c = Catalogue of Life, g = GBIF, b = Bugguide.net

References
Slosser, JE. Biology of Coleothorpa Dominicana Franciscana (Leconte). Vol. 28, Southwestern Entomologist, 2003.

Further reading

External links

 

Clytrini
Articles created by Qbugbot
Beetles described in 1801